The WCPW Middleweight Championship was a professional wrestling middleweight championship in Windy City Pro Wrestling (WCPW). It was the original secondary title for the promotion before the creation of the WCPW League Championship in 1993 and its incorporation into the then newly created weight-class division as a legitimate middleweight title (211 to 240 lbs).

The inaugural champion was K.C. Knight, who defeated Mike Samson in Hebron, Indiana on April 13, 1991 to become the first WCW Middleweight Champion. Mike Anthony and Chris "Curse" Collins are tied for the record for most reigns, with two each. At 455 days, Ripper Manson's reign is the longest in the title's history. "The Golden Greek" Mike Londos's reign was the shortest in the history of the title as he lost it to Stone Manson less than 10 minutes after having won the belt. Overall, there have been 27 reigns shared between 25 wrestlers, with three vacancies, and 1 deactivation.

Title history
Key

Names

Reigns

Combined reigns

References

External links
WindyCityProWrestling.com
Title History - Windy City Pro Wrestling
 WCPW Middleweight Championship

Middleweight Championship
Middleweight wrestling championships